Brett Alexander Blake Lindros (born December 2, 1975) is a Canadian former professional ice hockey player and television personality. He is the younger brother of Eric Lindros.

Personal life
Lindros was born in London, Ontario and raised in Toronto, Ontario. The son of Carl Lindros and Bonnie Roszell-Lindros, Brett has Swedish heritage. The name "Lindros" means "Rose of the Linden tree". His great grandfather Axel immigrated to Canada from Bredaryd, Sweden, and Brett is the third generation of the Lindros family to be born in Canada. His father Carl Lindros received a B.A. from the University of Western Ontario (where he played football, well enough to be drafted 30th overall by the Edmonton Eskimos in the 1970 CFL College Draft), and became a Chartered Accountant. His mother Bonnie is a registered nurse. He has one brother Eric and one sister Robin.

Playing career
Lindros was drafted in the 1994 NHL Entry Draft, 1st round, 9th overall by the New York Islanders.

After suffering a series of concussions, he was forced to retire on May 1, 1996 due to post-concussion syndrome after playing only 51 NHL games.
Lindros now works in Toronto for hedge fund HGC Investment Management.

Life after hockey
Lindros was badly injured in a 2001 snowmobile accident; police reported that alcohol was a factor in the accident. The snowmobile was being driven by Dan Cameron, 25, of Toronto. Lindros, who was the passenger on the snowmobile, was charged with operating a snowmachine without a licence or permit.

Career statistics

See also
Notable families in the NHL

References

External links

1975 births
Living people
Canadian ice hockey right wingers
Canadian people of Swedish descent
Ice hockey people from Toronto
Kingston Frontenacs players
National Hockey League first-round draft picks
New York Islanders draft picks
New York Islanders players
Sportspeople from London, Ontario